Chris Babb (born February 14, 1990) is an American professional basketball player for Bnei Herzliya of the Israeli Basketball Premier League. He played college basketball for Pennsylvania State University and Iowa State University.

Early life
Babb was born and raised in Kansas. After seventh grade his family moved to Arlington, Texas, where his father eventually got into the barbeque business, opening up Babb Brothers BBQ & Blues in nearby Dallas. It was here that he attended The Oakridge School where he averaged 31.2 points while helping his school to a 26–3 record and a district championship as a senior. He also averaged 8.1 rebounds, 7.2 assists and totaled a school-record 1,125 points.

College career

In his freshman season at Penn State, Babb played sparingly for the Lions. In 32 games, he averaged 2.8 points and 1.1 rebounds in 10 minutes per game.

In his sophomore season, he was third on the team in assists (69) and steals (22), and made the second-most 3-pointers on the team, hitting 69-of-185 (37.3 percent) from beyond the arc. In 31 games (23 starts), he averaged 9.3 points, 3.2 rebounds and 2.2 assists in 29.7 minutes per game.

In 2011, he transferred to Iowa State University. After redshirting the 2011–12 season due to NCAA transfer rules, he had a good junior season for the Cyclones, as he went on to be ranked 10th in the Big 12 in 3-pointers per game at 1.9. In 34 games (all starts), he averaged 7.8 points, 4.1 rebounds, 1.6 assists and 1.0 steals in 33.1 minutes per game.

In November 2012, Babb was suspended for the first two games of the 2012–13 season for violating team rules. He went on to be named to the 2013 Big 12 All-Defensive Team. In 33 games (all starts), he averaged 9.1 points, 3.4 rebounds, 2.2 assists and 1.1 steals in 32.7 minutes per game. He made 38.2 percent of his 3-pointers, which accounted for 5.2 of his 7.2 field goal attempts per game that season.

College statistics 

|-
| style="text-align:left;"| 2008–09
| style="text-align:left;"| Penn State
| 32 || 0 || 10.1 || .337 || .349 || .619 || 1.1 || .5 || .3 || .1 || 2.8
|-
| style="text-align:left;"| 2009–10
| style="text-align:left;"| Penn State
| 31 || 23 || 29.7 || .372 || .373 || .816 || 3.2 || 2.2 || .7 || .3 || 9.3
|-
| style="text-align:left;"| 2011–12
| style="text-align:left;"| Iowa State
| 34 || 34 || 33.1 || .362 || .328 || .667 || 4.1 || 1.6 || 1.0 || .1 || 7.8
|-
| style="text-align:left;"| 2012–13
| style="text-align:left;"| Iowa State
| 33 || 33 || 32.7 || .409 || .382 || .745 || 3.4 || 2.2 || 1.1 || .2 || 9.1
|-
| style="text-align:left;"| Career
| style="text-align:left;"| 
| 130 || 90 || 26.5 || .377 || .359 || .733 || 3.0 || 1.7 || .8 || .2 || 7.2

Professional career

2013–14 season
After going undrafted in the 2013 NBA draft, Babb joined the Phoenix Suns for the 2013 NBA Summer League. On September 30, 2013, he signed with the Boston Celtics. However, he was later waived by the Celtics on October 26, 2013. On October 31, 2013, he was acquired by the Maine Red Claws of the NBA Development League as an affiliate player of the Celtics.

On February 28, 2014, Babb signed a 10-day contract with the Boston Celtics. On March 11, 2014, he signed a second 10-day contract with the Celtics. On March 21, 2014, he signed a multi-year, non-guaranteed deal with the Celtics.

2014–15 season
In July 2014, Babb joined the Boston Celtics for the 2014 NBA Summer League. On September 25, 2014, he was waived by the Celtics. October 31, 2014, he was reacquired by the Maine Red Claws. On February 4, 2015, he was named to the Futures All-Star team for the 2015 NBA D-League All-Star Game. On March 5, 2015, he scored a career-high 33 points in the Red Claws' 121–110 win over the Austin Spurs.

On April 6, 2015, Babb signed a multi-year deal with the Boston Celtics, but was immediately assigned back down to the Red Claws. Six days later, he was recalled by the Celtics after the Red Claws were eliminated from the D-League playoffs. He did not appear in a game for the Celtics in his second stint with the team.

2015–16 season
On July 27, 2015, Babb was traded, along with Gerald Wallace, to the Golden State Warriors in exchange for David Lee. On October 23, 2015, he was waived by the Warriors after appearing in five preseason games.

On November 19, 2015, Babb signed with ratiopharm Ulm of the German Basketball Bundesliga. In 32 league games for Ulm in 2015–16, he averaged 10.3 points, 4.0 rebounds and 3.2 assists per game. He also averaged 10.1 points, 2.5 rebounds, 1.7 assists and 1.4 steals in 10 Eurocup games.

2016–17 season
On June 14, 2016, Babb re-signed with ratiopharm Ulm for the 2016–17 season. He finished the regular season setting a new record for the German BBL: 100 successful 3-point made (out of 233 3-point attempts, representing a 42.9% 3-point rate over the entire regular season).

2017–18 season
On July 5, 2017, Babb signed a two-year deal with Russian club Lokomotiv Kuban. They parted ways in July 2018.

2018–19 season
On July 15, 2018, Babb signed a deal with Bahçeşehir of the Basketbol Süper Ligi.

2019–20 season
On July 16, 2019, Babb moved to Greece for Promitheas of the Greek Basket League and the EuroCup. He averaged 9.8 points per game.

2020–21 season
On August 9, 2020, Babb signed with Telekom Baskets Bonn of the Basketball Bundesliga. He averaged 17 points, 3.1 assists, and 2.1 rebounds per game.

2021–22 season
On October 4, 2021, Babb signed with Bnei Herzliya of the Israeli Basketball Premier League.

NBA career statistics

Regular season

|-
| style="text-align:left;"| 
| style="text-align:left;"| Boston
| 14 || 0 || 9.4 || .267 || .222 || .000 || 1.2 || .2 || .4 || .0 || 1.6
|- class="sortbottom"
| style="text-align:center;" colspan="2" | Career
| 14 || 0 || 9.4 || .267 || .222 || .000 || 1.2 || .2 || .4 || .0 || 1.6

Personal life
Babb is the son of Mike and Nikki Babb, and has a younger brother named Nick, who played basketball for Iowa State University and professionally in Germany. His cousin, John Babb, played college football at Baker University.

References

External links
Iowa State Cyclones bio
Penn State Nittany Lions bio
NBA D-League profile

1990 births
Living people
American expatriate basketball people in Germany
American expatriate basketball people in Russia
American expatriate basketball people in Turkey
American men's basketball players
Bahçeşehir Koleji S.K. players
Basketball players from Kansas
Bnei Hertzeliya basketball players
Boston Celtics players
Iowa State Cyclones men's basketball players
Maine Red Claws players
PBC Lokomotiv-Kuban players
Promitheas Patras B.C. players
Penn State Nittany Lions basketball players
Ratiopharm Ulm players
Shooting guards
Sportspeople from Topeka, Kansas
Telekom Baskets Bonn players
Undrafted National Basketball Association players